Japanese figure skater and two-time Olympic champion, Yuzuru Hanyu, has produced four ice shows in the course of his career. The first one, titled Continues with Wings, was held in April2018 at the Musashino Forest Sport Plaza in Tokyo. It was a special three-day event to celebrate his back-to-back wins at the 2014 and 2018 Winter Olympics and pay tribute to the skaters who had supported and influenced him.

In 2022, Hanyu launched his professional skating career and challenged the uncustomary concept of a solo ice show, with no other guest skaters in the line-up. His first solo show Prologue was held in November at the Pia Arena MM in Yokohama and December at the Flat Hachinohe, lasting 90 minutes with skating at the athletic level of competition programs, including an unconventional 6-minute warm-up session to open. The show was directed in collaboration with Japanese choreographer Mikiko, implementing the technology of projection mapping in Hanyu's figure skating programs. His second solo show Gift, presented in February2023, was the first skating event to be held at the Tokyo Dome, one of Japan's largest and most prestigious entertainment venues. In front of a record ice show audience of 35,000 spectators, he performed a total of 12 programs in a span of 150 minutes, accompanied by the dance group Elevenplay, the Tokyo Philharmonic Orchestra, and a live band lead by Satoshi Takebe.

In March 2023, a special commemoration event of the 2011 Tōhoku earthquake and tsunami with the title Yuzuru Hanyu Notte Stellata was held at the Sekisui Heim Super Arena in Rifu, Miyagi, featuring a cast of international professional skaters as well as three-time Olympic gymnastics champion Kohei Uchimura, merging the sports of figure skating and artistic gymnastics for the first time.

Continues with Wings 2018

 was Yuzuru Hanyu's first self-produced ice show, organized in collaboration with CIC Co., Ltd. and TV Asahi, and was held at the Musashino Forest Sport Plaza in Chōfu, Tokyo, on April13–15, 2018. It was a one-off event to celebrate Hanyu's win of back-to-back Olympic titles in 2014 and 2018, and to express his gratitude to fans and skaters who had inspired and supported him in the course of his career.

The show lasted 2.5 hours and was directed by Hanyu, featuring a mix of exhibition programs as well as multiple talk rounds between Hanyu and the invited skaters. Each guest was introduced with a personal video message by Hanyu. Due to his recuperation from an ankle injury, he was not initially scheduled to perform. However, at the end of the show, he gave a surprise performance with a medley of past competition programs, skipping jump elements due to the injury. The show finale was arranged by Hanyu's former choreographers Jeffrey Buttle and Shae-Lynn Bourne to the song "Time to Say Goodbye", performed by the full cast.

Besides Buttle and Bourne, the cast featured Hanyu's skating idols Evgeni Plushenko and Johnny Weir, five-time Japanese national champion Minoru Sano who had introduced Hanyu and his sister to figure skating, and Hanyu's former training mate Takahito Mura who helped him to master the triple Axel jump, which later became one of Hanyu's signature elements. Eventually, the cast included two-time European champions in pair skating, Alexander Smirnov and Yuko Kavaguti, whose move from Japan to Russia encouraged Hanyu to challenge a skating career abroad as well, moving from Sendai to Toronto, Canada, in 2012. Like Hanyu, Sano and Kavaguti were both trained by Japanese coach . The two-time World champions Stéphane Lambiel and Javier Fernández were not able to attend the event in person, but sent video messages to Hanyu that were shown on screen in the arena.

The venue was sold out on all three days of the show, with a capacity of 9,000 seats and ticket prices ranging from 6,000 to 18,000 yen ($57–171 as of 2018). The last day was screened live in 66 movie theaters nationwide and aired live on the Japanese subscription channel CS TV Asahi. On May6, 2022, Continues with Wings was rebroadcast on the channel as part of the program special "Golden Week Figure Skating". The event was sponsored by the cleaning and skin care company P&G as well as the Japanese airline ANA among others.

Prologue 2022

 was Hanyu's first ice show since the launch of his professional skating career, organized in partnership with TV Asahi and CIC Co., Ltd. It was held in two cities, at the Pia Arena MM in Yokohama on November4–5 and the Flat Hachinohe on December2–3, and5, 2022. The show was produced and directed by Hanyu in collaboration with Japanese choreographer Mikiko, who had previously worked with the Japanese pop trio Perfume among others.  player Kōki Nakamura co-starred as a guest artist and performed live with Hanyu to the song "" from Monkey Majik and the Yoshida Brothers. The title Prologue was selected by Hanyu, marking the beginning of his professional career.

At Prologue, Hanyu challenged the concept of a solo ice show with him as the only scheduled skater, which is an unusual approach compared to established show formats. The first major era of ice shows, headlined by Ice Follies and Ice Capades from the 1930s to 1980s, typically featured large skating ensembles inspired by ballet and theater. Since the late 1980s, ice shows experienced a shift towards smaller casts with elite international skaters, including multiple Olympic and World champions. However, a solo ice show of 90 minutes was considered impractical due to the physical limits of skating and performing for a longer period. Hanyu's preparations included a significant improvement of his stamina, five practice run-throughs of the full show, and a new approach to commitment and pacing, stating: "I'm used to emptying the tank for one skate. I've never thought about heading back out immediately after. But I managed to add the strength and stamina I needed to get through it all." Three-time world champion Patrick Chan from Canada expressed his respect for Hanyu's accomplishment: "Just one person, without any group dancing in the middle? How is that possible? I think, Yuzu is the only person in the world who can do that. It's unbelievable stamina."

According to Hanyu, the priority at Prologue was to adapt to the new show format and get through the planned content without injuries or overstrain. He performed eight to ten programs on one day, some of them being trimmed in length and technical content to match his physical capacity. His free skate program Romeo + Juliet was arranged as a split performance, with the first half being screened as a recording from the 2011–12 Grand Prix Final and the second half skated live in the arena. Another challenge was the limited number of breaks for recovery. He bridged the time between his programs with a "talk corner", answering selected questions from fans, and a live voting round, with the audience choosing a program for Hanyu to skate on each day. In addition, a series of video segments was shown on screen, featuring scenes of Hanyu's childhood and competitive career.

Unlike most ice shows where skaters perform in a dimly lit arena, Hanyu opened Prologue at full lighting with an unconventional six-minute warm-up session and a four-minute version of his Olympic free skate program Seimei, reproducing the setting and atmosphere of a competition. Despite the physical strain of a 90-minute solo show, the program featured two quadruple jumps and three triple Axels, a technical merit that exceeded the difficulty of a common exhibition performance. The show setting allowed Hanyu to circumvent the repetition rules of figure skating competitions and include more than two triple Axel jumps in his program. Also notable was the implementation of projection mapping in two programs, directed by choreographer Mikiko. The skating was filmed from a distant, aerial perspective, being captured together with the projected text elements and images. Hanyu used this technology in his performances to "" and his new, self-choreographed program to "" from the soundtrack of the video game Final Fantasy X. The choreography was motivated by Hanyu's practice cool-down routines, which enjoy great popularity among fans.

The show received universal praise among Japanese media, who pointed out Hanyu's ability to skate full shows at high quality and technical difficulty, making no major mistakes on multiple days, which earned him standing ovations from the audience. Writer Takaomi Matsubara from the magazine Sports Graphic Number named Prologue a new milestone in professional skating. The show was sold out on all five days, with prices ranging from 15,000 to 25,000 yen ($107–178 as of 2022) and tickets being distributed by lottery sale. The Pia Arena MM in Yokohama accommodated 7,900 viewers, the Flat Hachinohe 3,000. Due to the small venue capacity and high ticket demand for the Hachinohe shows, an additional third show on December5 was added to the initial schedule. The final days of the two stops were screened live in movie theaters nationwide, with 81 participating cinemas for the Hachinohe show. In addition, they were aired live on CS TV Asahi, leading to a significant increase of subscribers on the Japanese television channel. The event was sponsored by Kosé, Nishikawa Co., Ltd. as well as the food and biotechnology corporation Ajinomoto. The show in Yokohama received special sponsorship by Towa Pharmaceutical.

Gift – Ice Story 2023

Gift (full title stylized as 'GIFT – Ice Story 2023') was Hanyu's second solo ice show, performed on February26, 2023, at the Tokyo Dome in Bunkyo, Tokyo. The one-off event was again produced and directed by Hanyu in collaboration with choreographer Mikiko. The duration was extended from 90 to 150 minutes with an additional 40-minute intermission, using more advanced technology than at the previous show Prologue. According to Hanyu, Gift was designed with a narrative character, portraying his "life and future on ice". The show was constructed as a "journey through the worlds of his personality" with focus on dreams and the motif of lonesomeness. Hanyu expressed his hope that Gift could provide a "place to return to whenever people find themselves alone." He further explained: "The story is the main subject, and my programs exist within the story with various meanings. The programs are like a picture book, where you can watch the skating as if you were coming to appreciate a story." The show's story was announced to be released as a print book written by Hanyu with illustrations by the Japanese mangaka group Clamp who are internationally known for Card Captor Sakura among other works.

Gift marked the first time that a figure skater performed and an ice rink was set up at the Tokyo Dome, one of Japan's largest multipurpose venues with a maximum capacity of 55,000 seats. It was constructed as a baseball stadium, home to the Yomiuri Giants, but it also serves as a concert venue, with Michael Jackson, Paul McCartney, The Rolling Stones, U2, Beyoncé, and Bruno Mars among past guest artists. Hanyu expressed his hope to "change how people perceive figure skating [with his show] at the Tokyo Dome." The Olympics' official news site called Hanyu's programs at Gift "performances for the ages", noting that it was "more a concert for a blockbuster artist than an ice show." At the venue, a mobile rink was set up with a surface of 60m× 30m, the standard rink size at figure skating competitions. For the narration and performances, a special screen was installed behind the rink, larger in size than the one used during baseball matches. In charge of the direction, projection mapping, and special effects was Mikiko in collaboration with the company Rhizomatiks. Among the guest artists were the Japanese dance group Elevenplay as well as the Tokyo Philharmonic Orchestra and a Gift special band lead by music producer Satoshi Takebe.

In the show, Hanyu performed a total of twelve skating programs, among them shortened versions of his world record programs Hope and Legacy, Ballade No. 1, and Seimei. He also presented two new programs to Joe Hisaishi's music piece "One Summer's Day" from the movie Spirited Away and to the song "Ashura-chan" by Japanese pop singer Ado. In both performances Hanyu was accompanied by Elevenplay. He concluded the first half with a six-minute warm-up and challenge of his short program from the 2022 Winter Olympics to Introduction and Rondo Capriccioso. At the Olympics, after getting caught in a hole in the ice, Hanyu had turned his opening quad Salchow jump into a single, which was a factor in missing out on a medal in his final Winter Games. At Gift, he gave a solid performance with the same technical difficulty as in 2022, landing both planned quads and a triple Axel. Overall, he landed six successful quadruple jumps in the first half of the show as well as multiple triple Axels in the second half, surpassing the technical merit of his previous show Prologue. In the finale, Satoshi Takebe presented a new music piece titled "Gift" on the piano, which he had composed exclusively for the show.

Prior to the event, critics such as the Japanese evening newspaper Nikkan Gendai had voiced concerns regarding the size of the venue among other issues. However, despite the large capacity and prices ranging from 23,100 to 27,500 yen ($177–210 as of 2023), tickets were distributed by lottery sale, and the number of applications exceeded the available ticket quota in the first lottery round, with multiple fans missing out on a chance to attend the show. On December20, 2022, the hashtag  made it to the top trends on the social media platform Twitter. By February12, 2023, the venue was sold out with seats for 35,000 spectators, a new record for an ice show audience, and sales exceeded an estimated total of 1 billion yen. According to the Olympics, the global accessibility and live streaming of Gift was on an "unprecedented scale for a figure skating event" as well. The show was screened live at 84 movie theaters in Japan and also at cinemas overseas in Hong Kong, Taiwan, and South Korea, with 30,000 visitors in total. In addition, the event was aired live on the subscription streaming platforms Disney+ in Japan and Globe Coding by Live Viewing Japan Inc. worldwide. To accommodate demand, the show was rescreened on the following day at movie theaters in Japan. The event received special sponsorship from the Japanese multinational cosmetics and skin care company Kosé. Other sponsors included Phiten, Towa Pharmaceutical, and real estate developer Mitsui Fudosan.

Yuzuru Hanyu Notte Stellata 2023

 was an ice show presented on March10–12, 2023, at the Sekisui Heim Super Arena in Rifu, Miyagi, organized by Nippon TV and its local station Miyagi TV. It was a commemoration event for the 12th anniversary of the 2011 Tōhoku earthquake and tsunami, also known as the "Great East Japan Earthquake" or "3.11", that cost 19,759 people's lives in north-east Japan. It was Hanyu's first self-produced ensemble show since the launch of his professional career, featuring a cast of international professional skaters with Jason Brown, Shae-Lynn Bourne-Turok, Satoko Miyahara, Akiko Suzuki, Keiji Tanaka, Takahito Mura, Rika Hongo, and hula hoop skater Violetta Afanasieva. The cast also included Japanese gymnast and three-time Olympic champion Kohei Uchimura, merging the sports of artistic gymnastics and figure skating for the first time. Canadian David Wilson created the choreography for the show.

The title "" ( in Italian) was inspired by Hanyu's Olympic exhibition program to the song "Notte Stellata (The Swan)" from the operatic pop trio Il Volo, which reflected Hanyu's memories of the disaster. On March11, 2011, he was practicing at his home rink in Sendai, when the earthquake hit the north-east coast of Japan. Hanyu spent the following days at an evacuation center with his family, experiencing a blackout on the night of the disaster: "It turned pitch black just like that and the electricity was out. It was so dark in the city, but I remember thinking how bright the stars were then. I want this to be about everyone's remembrance of 3.11, like what they thought when they were looking up at the sky that evening. I want this to be an opportunity to bring people together." At Notte Stellata, for the first time in his career, Hanyu got the opportunity to perform in front of an audience on March 11 to commemorate the events and pay tribute to the victims of the earthquake.

Each show lasted 90 minutes, and they were opened by Hanyu with a performance to "Notte Stellata", followed by a group performance of the cast and individual programs by the invited skaters. The first half was concluded with a collaboration between Hanyu on the ice and Kohei Uchimura on the floor to the music piece "Conquest of Paradise" by Vangelis. The two athletes were taking turns in performing, Hanyu presenting multiple jumps and a cartwheel, and Uchimura showing four consecutive whips with a layout somersault among other elements. They finished the program with a synchronized sit spin and double leg circle rotation as well as a side-by-side quad toe loop and double twisting back layout. For Uchimura's pommel horse exercises, a mushroom trainer was installed in front of the floor apparatus. The second half of the show was opened with a group number by Hongo, Suzuki, Bourne-Turok, and Mura to the song "Dynamite" from the K-pop band BTS. During the program, a dance performance of Hanyu was shown on screen and on the ice surface using projection mapping technology. A total of 20 programs was performed, closing with Hanyu's exhibition program to "", in which he expressed his thoughts on the reconstruction, and a group skate to "" by Misia in the show finale.

The Sekisui Heim Super Arena is located in Rifu near Hanyu's hometown of Sendai and served as a morgue at the time of the disaster in 2011. The venue was sold out with an attendance of 6,000 spectators per day, and tickets were again distributed by lottery sale with prices ranging from 15,000 to 29,000 yen ($111–214 as of 2023). All three days of the show were screened live at movie theaters in Japan as well as overseas in Hong Kong and Taiwan. In addition, they were aired live nationally on the subscription streaming platform Hulu Japan, and are planned to be broadcast on CS Nittele Plus on March31, 2023. An extended version with behind-the-scenes footage is scheduled for April23 on the same channel. The event was sponsored by Kose's skincare and cosmetics brand Sekkisei, Towa Pharmaceutical, and the Japanese travel agency JTB.

See also

Yuzuru Hanyu series
Yuzuru Hanyu Olympic seasons
List of career achievements by Yuzuru Hanyu
List of programs and publications of Yuzuru Hanyu

Other
Ice shows
Fantasy on Ice
Le cygne ("Notte Stellata")

Official guide and documentary books

 40 p.

 64 p.

 104 p.
 40 p.

Notes and references

Citations

Print works cited

Further reading

Goto, Taisuke; Yamashita, Hironobu. Yuzuru Hanyu's thoughts on Gift. Asahi Shimbun interview series (in Japanese). Kita-ku, Osaka.
Part 1: 
Part 2: 
Part 3: 
Part 4: 
Part 5: 
Part 6: 

Matsubara, Takaomi (January 23, 2023). Yuzuru Hanyu's collaboration with sound designer Keiichi Yano for Prologue and Gift. Number article series (in Japanese). Chiyoda, Tokyo: Bungeishunjū.
Part 1: 
Part 2: 
Part 3:

External links
Yuzuru Hanyu at IMDb
Continues with Wings official website (in Japanese)
Prologue official website (in Japanese), Prologue official on YouTube
Gift official website (in English)
Notte Stellata official website (in Japanese)

Yuzuru Hanyu
Ice shows
Entertainment events in Japan
Performing arts in Japan
Works about the 2011 Tōhoku earthquake and tsunami